Javier de Villota (Madrid, 1994) is a Spanish painter, sculptor and architect who comes from two generations of artists, being the great-grandson of José Diaz y Palma and grandnephew of José Gutierrez Solana who deeply influenced his career.

References

Bibliografía 
 Villota, F. J. D. (2001). Javier de Villota : retrospectiva 1970-2001 : Centro Cultural de la Villa, 25 de septiembre-4 de noviembre de 2001. [Madrid], Concejalía de Cultura, Educación, Juventud y Deporte.  
 Villota, J. D., Villota, A. D., Mantecón, M., & Harithas, J. (2013). Ecos en la deshumanización: [Centro de Arte Alcobendas, del 21 de mayo al 29 de junio de 2013]. Alcobendas, Madrid, Centro de Arte Alcobendas.  
 Spanish Institute (London). (1978). "Villota."
 Villota, F. J. D. (1971). Villota : catálogo exposición; marzo, 1972. Madrid, Grin-Gho, Galería de Arte Contemporáneo.

External links
  
 Página web oficial de Javier de Villota
 Javier de Villota contribuye con la colección del MAC de Chile (2013)
 Lo irracional cala en la obra de Javier de Villota (2013)
 Javier de Villota en el Centro de Arte de Alcobendas: Ecos en la deshumanización (2013)
 La muestra Dehumanization Echo de Javier de Villota en el Station Museum no deja indiferente en Tejas según recoge el diario de la ciudad Houston Press
 Enlace oficial a la exposición Dehumanization Echo celebrada en el Station Museum de Houston en Mayo de 2009
 Javier de Villota en el Diario de Centroamérica de Guatemala (2009)
 Javier de Villota en diario digital El Mostrador chileno: "La indiferencia nos hace cómplices" (2013)
 Corta biografía de Javier de Villota en el portal cultural Masdearte
 del diario ABC de la exposición retrospectiva de Javier de Villota en el Centro Cultural de la Villa de Madrid (2001)
 Un artista recrea la matanza de Sarajevo en el Conde Duque: Diario El País (1994)
 El pintor y escultor Javier de Villota, nuevo académico de San Telmo

1994 births
Living people
21st-century Spanish painters
Spanish male painters
Spanish sculptors
Spanish male sculptors
21st-century Spanish architects
21st-century Spanish male artists